Newport Pagnell is a town and civil parish in the City of Milton Keynes, Buckinghamshire, England.  The Office for National Statistics records Newport Pagnell as part of the Milton Keynes urban area. 

It is separated from the rest of the urban area by the M1 motorway, on which Newport Pagnell Services, the second service station to be opened in the United Kingdom, is located. 

The town is more widely known for having the only remaining vellum manufacturer in the United Kingdom, and being the original home of the exclusive sports car manufacturer Aston Martin.

History

The town was first mentioned in the Domesday Book of 1086 as Neuport, Old English for 'New Market Town', but by that time, the old Anglo-Saxon town was dominated by the Norman invaders. The suffix 'Pagnell' came later when the manor passed into the hands of the Pagnell (Paynel) family. It was the principal town of the "Three Hundreds of Newport", a district that had almost the same boundary as the modern City of Milton Keynes UA.

The Grade I listed Tickford Bridge, over the River Ouzel (or Lovat), was built in 1810. It is one of just a few cast iron bridges in Britain that still carry modern road traffic. Near the footbridge at the side, there is a plaque placed by Newport Pagnell Historical Society that gives details of its history and construction. The Ouzel joins the Great Ouse nearby, and a large set of sluice gates, used to control downstream flooding, is located near the bridge.

Between 1817 and 1864, the town was linked to the Grand Junction Canal at Great Linford via the Newport Pagnell Canal. In 1862, the canal owners sold the route to the London and North Western Railway. For a hundred years (1867 to 1967), Newport Pagnell was served by Newport Pagnell railway station, the terminus on the Wolverton to Newport Pagnell branch line. (The route is now a rail trail, part of the Milton Keynes redway system.)

The population of Newport Pagnell and its hinterland at the 1801 Census was 17,576; by 1911 it had grown to 14,428. The population of Newport Pagnell Urban District alone is first recorded at the 1911 Census as 4,238 and had reached 4,743 by 1961.

Industry
From 1954 until 2007, the town was the home to the sports car manufacturer Aston Martin. The Newport Pagnell factory was considered outdated and a new production facility was built near Gaydon in Warwickshire. There is still a service facility in Newport Pagnell, but the factory on the north side of Tickford St has since been demolished apart from the engine shop, board room and offices that are listed buildings. The land behind these has been developed by a housing developer. The buildings at the front, including the house used as a board room, have been restored and will be used as commercial sites. In 2012, Aston Martin completely modernised the service facility and the site also houses a bespoke sales department.

Notable industries in the town include the only remaining vellum manufacturer in the United Kingdom, William Cowley, located at Parchment Works, 97 Caldecote Street.

This has led to a number of new housing developments in the area.

Churches

The modern civil parish of Newport Pagnell stops at the M1, but the Church of England ecclesiastical parish extends to include Broughton and Caldecote. The parish church is dedicated to St Peter and St Paul.

Education
The town is home to four primary schools - Tickford Park Primary School, Cedars, Green Park Primary School, and Portfields Primary School - and three pre-schools - River Meadows, Lovat Hall and Northern Pastures. It is also home to one of two campuses of Ousedale School (the other one being in nearby Olney), which serves students from across the town and its surrounding villages, and is one of the best performing secondary schools in the City of Milton Keynes.

Location and transport
The town is located at the north-eastern corner of the Milton Keynes urban area, overlooking the rural parts of the Unitary Authority area. It is served by the M1 motorway from Junction 14 ( to the south) via the A509 which, along with the A422 and Wolverton Road, connects it with (the rest of) the Milton Keynes BUA. To the east of the town, the A422 and A509 multiplex northwards to form the Newport Pagnell Eastern Bypass, providing links to Bedford, Wellingborough and Kettering.  The historic Newport Pagnell-Northampton road (B526) runs through the centre of the town, linking rural villages to the north, and provides a secondary route to Northampton.

In February 2021, developers presented to Milton Keynes City Council proposals for the development of a new community to the south of Newport Pagnell, with the construction of approximately 5,000 homes. In planning documents, the new area is called "Milton Keynes East", and is proposed to include a local centre with two primary schools and a secondary school. It is to have direct road links to Newport Pagnell town centre, and Central Milton Keynes via an expansion of the Milton Keynes grid road system. 

It was proposed in January 2021 that, with the money that had been given to Milton Keynes City Council as part of the UK Government's Active Travel Fund, Tongwell Lane in Newport Pagnell would be converted into a redway, which would better link the town with the Milton Keynes designated area. Since its completion in March 2021, the town has been served by three connections to the wider redway network of Milton Keynes, all heading westwards into Blakelands first: Tongwell Lane, Stanmore Gardens and the Wolverton-Newport Pagnell railway walk.

Rail
The closest passenger rail service is at Wolverton railway station (approximately  distant), with inter-city services accessible from Milton Keynes Central (approximately  distant).

Bus
Bus 21 (Red Rose) operates an hourly service from Monday to Friday, connecting the town with Olney and Lavendon to the north, and Central Milton Keynes to the south-west. Operating roughly every 30 mins from Monday to Friday are the Arriva-operated Bus 1 (serving Willen and CMK), and Bus 2/2A (serving Crownhill).

Governance

There are two tiers of local government covering Newport Pagnell, at parish (town) and unitary authority level: Newport Pagnell Town Council and Milton Keynes City Council. The town council has its offices and meeting place at 80 High Street. In City Council elections, the town is divided between the Newport Pagnell South, and Newport Pagnell North and Hanslope wards.

Newport Pagnell became the headquarters of Newport Pagnell Rural District under the Local Government Act 1894. In 1897, Newport Pagnell became the sole civil parish within the newly created Newport Pagnell Urban District. The former urban district was an unparished area from 1974 to 1985, governed directly by Milton Keynes Borough Council. The civil parish of Newport Pagnell was re-established in 1985, with its council adopting the name Newport Pagnell Town Council.

Demography
Although Newport Pagnell was excluded from the 1967 designated area of Milton Keynes, its growth has been at a similar level to that of the constituent towns of the latter; the two now join at the M1 and there are no other practical distinctions between them. As of 2001, the Office for National Statistics records Newport Pagnell as part of the Milton Keynes Urban Area. By the 2001 census, its population had increased significantly from 6,000 in 1971 to 15,020. In 2006, the Borough Council projected that the population will remain broadly stable at this level, and by the 2011 census, the population had increased very little to 15,118.

Sport and leisure

Newport Pagnell has a Non-League football team Newport Pagnell Town F.C., nicknamed the Swans, who play at The Pavilion on Willen Road. An ITF Taekwon-Do club, Kicks Taekwon-Do Academy, trains at Cedars Primary School, Bury Street, and a swimming pool. Between 1959-1960 it was the headquarters of the Aston Martin F1 team.

Newport Pagnell Lawn Bowls 
Bowls has been played in Newport Pagnell for over 400 years as maps of the Town dating from the mid 17 Century show a public House called “The Bowling Green”. The Newport Pagnell Bowling Club was founded in 1905 and the club used the Bowling Green behind the George pub in Tickford Street (currently The Magic Wok 2019). The game was developing locally due to the Railways, with clubs at Wolverton existing already and Olney forming in 1906. After the Great War, the Club purchased a plot of land known as “The Bully” and the Club remains at this site in Castle Meadow to the current day.

Notable people

 Lawrence Humphrey (ca.15271590), English theologian, President of Magdalen College, Oxford and Dean successively of Gloucester and Winchester cathedrals.
 Francis Annesley, 1st Viscount Valentia (ca.15851660), statesman and MP; lived in Newport Pagnell.
 Arthur Annesley, 1st Earl of Anglesey (16141686) royalist statesman, created Baron Annesley of Newport Pagnell in 1661.
 Lewis Atterbury (16561731), a churchman, a royal chaplain to two monarchs.
 William Bull (b. 1738 in Irthlingborough1814), minister to the Independent Church, now United Reformed Church. He established the Newport Pagnell Academy in 1783 to train dissenting preachers.
 George Walters (18291872) won the Victoria Cross at the Battle of Inkermann in 1854.
 Frederick Woodward Branson (18511933), chemist, glassblower, instrument maker and X-ray pioneer.
 Charles Sanford Terry (1864–1936), historian, musicologist and authority on J. S. Bach
 Nigel Benson (born 1955) author, illustrator and fine artist specializing in oils and pastels
 Richard Hopkins (1964–2012), TV producer of Big Brother and Strictly Come Dancing
 Letitia Dean (born 1967), actress; went to Cedars School in the town.
 Richard Meredith (born ca.1970), writer of adventure travel novels, lives in Newport Pagnell.
 Kelly George (born 1970), actor; star of BBC children's television series Grange Hill, lived and educated in the town.
 Gordon Moakes (born 1976), bassist of Indie band Bloc Party, educated in Newport Pagnell.
 Tom Austin (born 2000), stage name Niko B, YouTuber and rapper, lives in Newport Pagnell.

Sport 
 Henry Bull (1843–1905), first-class cricketer, played 21 games.
 David Oldfield (born 1968) footballer with 678 club caps, lived in Newport Pagnell.
 Steve Brooker (born 1981), footballer with 261 club caps.
 James Nash (born 1985), World Touring Car Championship driver, lives in Newport Pagnell.
 Leah Williamson (born 1997), footballer, plays for Arsenal W.F.C., captains England.

References

External links

Newport Pagnell Town Council

Populated places on the River Great Ouse
Towns in Buckinghamshire
Milton Keynes
Civil parishes in Buckinghamshire